The 2015 UWW World Wrestling Championships were the 12th edition of World Wrestling Championships of combined events and was held from September 7 to 12 in Las Vegas, United States.

Medal table

Team ranking

Medal summary

Men's freestyle

Men's Greco-Roman

Women's freestyle

Participating nations
821 competitors from 95 nations participated.

 (3)
 (2)
 (5)
 (2)
 (15)
 (3)
 (12)
 (23)
 (23)
 (1)
 (17)
 (22)
 (2)
 (18)
 (4)
 (24)
 (2)
 (10)
 (1)
 (6)
 (11)
 (10)
 (2)
 (3)
 (9)
 (1)
 (6)
 (8)
 (7)
 (16) 
 (20)
 (1)
 (11)
 (1)
 (1)
 (1)
 (1)
 (3)
 (21)
 (23)
 (16)
 (1)
 (1)
 (7)
 (12)
 (24)
 (24)
 (2)
 (16)
 (4)
 (7)
 (5)
 (3)
 (13)
 (16)
 (2)
 (16)
 (5)
 (3)
 (1)
 (1)
 (1)
 (1)
 (7)
 (6)
 (1)
 (3)
 (1)
 (1)
 (4)
 (16)
 (3)
 (10)
 (12)
 (23)
 (2)
 (7)
 (8)
 (2)
 (5)
 (22)
 (9)
 (4)
 (9)
 (7)
 (9)
 (1)
 (1)
 (24)
 (6)
 (24)
 (24)
 (15)
 (18)
 (5)

References 

 Wrestling Database
Event Schedule
Results Book

External links 
  Official website

 
World Wrestling Championships
World Wrestling Championships
Sports competitions in the Las Vegas Valley
World Wrestling Championships
International wrestling competitions hosted by the United States
World Wrestling Championships 2015